Sandro Foschini (born 7 February 1988) is a Swiss football midfielder, who currently plays for FC Wohlen.

External links

1988 births
Living people
Swiss men's footballers
Swiss Challenge League players
FC Luzern players
FC Gossau players
SC Kriens players
FC Aarau players
FC Frauenfeld players
FC Wohlen players
FC Winterthur players
Association football midfielders